Janaya Stephens is a Canadian film actress prominently featured in the Left Behind series of films as Chloe Steele. She appeared on the TV series Flashpoint, playing the character Sophie Lane.

Stephens was born in London, Ontario. In high school at Strathroy District Collegiate Institute, Stephens excelled at basketball and soccer. After graduating, she went on to play varsity basketball at Laurentian University for the Laurentian Lady Vee's while studying English and Drama. While at Laurentian, she starred as Juliet in the school's production of Romeo & Juliet. Later she went on to study at George Brown Theatre School in Toronto.

Janaya has appeared in the television shows Twice in a Lifetime, Relic Hunter, and Sue Thomas: F.B.Eye. Another notable movie role Janaya was the lead part of Marie Osmond in the 2001 ABC original television movie Inside the Osmonds. It was rebroadcast four years later on VH1. One of her more recent films was the 2008 film Death Race where she played opposite Jason Statham.

Filmography

Film

Television

External links
 Official Site
 
  International Society for Excellence in Christian Film & Television

Canadian film actresses
Canadian television actresses
Laurentian Voyageurs basketball players
21st-century Canadian actresses
Living people
Year of birth missing (living people)